Fahad Shah is a Kashmiri journalist from Srinagar, Jammu and Kashmir. He is the founder and editor of the news magazine The Kashmir Walla. He was a recipient of a Human Rights Press Award in 2021.

Shah was arrested on 4 February 2022 by Jammu and Kashmir Police for allegedly glorifying terrorism.

Journalism career
Shah tried to break into journalism in Delhi in 2009. The Kashmir Walla was initially his personal blog when he started it in 2011. Shah was interviewed about being a Kashmiri journalist by Mayank Austen Soofi. Disheartened by negative attitudes towards Kashmiris in comments to the article, Shah changed the focus of the blog to be a news magazine. The Kashmir Walla struggled prior to 2018, but later had a staff of 16 and in June 2019 started producing a weekly newspaper. Following the August 2019 Revocation of the special status of Jammu and Kashmir, the internet blackout and curfews led to the news magazine not being able to publish for months.

Shah's work has appeared in Foreign Affairs, Time, The Guardian, The Atlantic, and the South China Morning Post.

Detention, harassment and arrests
Shah has been summoned multiple times by Indian security agencies in relation to news reports he has published. Following his return from a trip to Pakistan in 2017, Shah was detained and questioned by police.

In July 2018 a teargas shell was fired into Shah's residence. Witnesses reported that the shell had been fired by security forces or armed forces. Shah's car was also vandalized by a paramilitary group.

2022 arrests
Shah was arrested by Kashmiri police on 4 February 2022 under the Unlawful Activities (Prevention) Act for "frequently glorifying terrorism, spreading fake news, and instigating people". He was charged with allegedly glorifying terrorism and was booked under the Public Safety Act. He had been called in for questioning following coverage in The Kashmir Walla of a police raid in the Pulwama district where four people were killed.

Shah was investigated for making statements causing public mischief and for sedition, but was granted bail on 26 February. He was immediately rearrested on separate charges including "provocation with intent to cause a riot", stemming from reports by The Kashmir Walla on allegations that official pressure was placed on a Kashmir school.

Shah was again granted bail on 5 March, and rearrested.

In April 2022, Shah's home and the offices of the news magazine were raided by Kashmir police and SIA over an opinion article written by The Kashmir Walla contributor Abdul Aala Fazili in 2011.

A National Investigation Agency court denied Shah bail on 15 July 2022.

Awards
Shah was nominated for a Reporters Without Borders award in 2020. He received the Human Rights Press Award for Explanatory Feature Writing in 2021 for reporting on violence against Muslims in Delhi for The Nation.

See also 
Censorship in Kashmir
Freedom of the press in India
Masrat Zahra

References

External links

Living people
Kashmiri journalists
Journalists from Jammu and Kashmir
Year of birth missing (living people)
Kashmiri people